FC Caracal was a Romanian professional football club from Caracal, Olt County, Romania.

History
The club was founded in Craiova in 1949 under the name of Metalul Craiova. It had various names during its history (see below), but the name which made it famous was Electroputere Craiova. 

As Extensiv Craiova it played its last season in Liga I. 

In the middle of the 2003–04 season, Extensiv changed its name to FC Craiova, but with no connection to the FC Craiova that existed between 1940–1949.

In 2004 the club was moved to Caracal and renamed FC Caracal.

After years of poor management and bad decisions, in 2013 the club was dissolved.

Chronology of names

Honours
Liga I
Best finish 3rd 1991–92
Liga II
Winners (2): 1990–91, 1998–99
Runners-up (2): 1996–97, 1997–98
Liga III
Winners (3): 1967–68, 1984–85, 1989–90
Runners-up (6): 1979–80, 1980–81, 1981–82, 1982–83, 2008–09, 2012–13

FC Caracal in Europe

Recent seasons

References

Liga I clubs
Liga II clubs
Liga III clubs
Association football clubs established in 1949
Association football clubs disestablished in 2013
Defunct football clubs in Romania
Football clubs in Olt County
Sport in Craiova
1949 establishments in Romania
Caracal, Romania